Daniel Matellon Ramos (born 2 February 1988) is a Cuban professional boxer who held the WBA interim light flyweight title from February to August 2021.

Professional career
Matellon made his professional debut against Johnny Garay on October 21, 2016. He won the fight by unanimous decision. He would go on to amass a 4-0-2 record before his first major title fight.

In his seventh professional fight, Matellon was scheduled to fight Kenny Cano for the vacant WBA Fedelatin light flyweight title, on September 30, 2017. Matellon won the fight by unanimous decision, with all three judges scoring the fight 105-104 in his favor.

Matellon was scheduled to defend his title against Camilo Mendoza on March 10, 2018. Matellon won the fight by a sixth-round knockout. Mendoza and his corner later disputed the victory, claiming the knockdown was a result of a head clash.

Matellon's next two fights were non-title bouts. He scored a second-round knockout of Fernando Godinez on May 4, 2018, and won a split decision against Masamichi Yabuki on September 29, 2018. Matellon was then scheduled to make his second title defense against Mario Andrade on April 30, 2019. He beat Andrade by a second-round knockout.

Matellon compiled a record of 11–0–2 before defeating Erik Lopez via majority decision (MD) to win the WBA interim light-flyweight title on 7 February 2020 at the Roberto Durán Arena in Panama.

Following a first-round knockout of Luis de la Rosa, in a non-title bout, Matellon was scheduled to fight Luis de la Rosa for the vacant WBA interim light flyweight title. Matellon outboxed his opponent to a majority decision victory, with two of the judges scoring the fight 116-112 for Matellon, while the third judge scored the fight as a 114-114 draw.

Matellon was scheduled to make his first WBA Interim title defense against the former IBF mini flyweight champion Jose Argumedo on June 26, 2021. Matellon won the fight by unanimous decision, with scorecards of 117-111, 115-113 and 115-113.

Matellon faced Ivan Garcia for the vacant WBA Fedecaribe light flyweight title on July 16, 2022. He won the fight by a third-round knockout.

Professional boxing record

See also
List of world light-flyweight boxing champions

References

External links

1988 births
Living people
Boxers from Havana
Cuban male boxers
Light-flyweight boxers
21st-century Cuban people